Crystal McCrary McGuire (formerly Crystal McCrary Anthony) is a writer, film producer and director, a former attorney and a broadcast personality. She is a creator and producer of entertainment content, including award-winning BET Networks shows Leading Women and Leading Men and youth basketball documentary Little Ballers, an author of fiction and of non-fiction articles, and has made numerous network television appearances, including as a legal analyst and a pop culture commentator. She runs marathons, and is a mother of three.

Biography
She was born in October 24, 1969, in Detroit, Michigan, to Magellan Gomez McCrary and Thelma Barrington, and into a family that includes 10 lawyers. She has one sister. After receiving a bachelor's degree magna cum laude, in 1991 from the University of Michigan, she attended the Washington College of Law at the American University in Washington, DC, and the New York University School of Law, earning her J.D. degree in 1995. While pursuing her law degree, she also joined the international law program sponsored by Tulane University, studying European Community law in Paris, France.

She rose to prominence as an entertainment lawyer, and married NBA basketball player Greg Anthony, with whom she had two children, including Orlando Magic point guard Cole Anthony, prior to divorcing. She later married former Wall Street executive Ray McGuire,  whom she joined on the campaign trail during his 2021 bid for Democratic mayoral candidate, and with whom she has one son.

Career

Attorney
She began her legal career as an associate at New York City law firm Paul, Weiss, Rifkind, Wharton & Garrison, where she represented entertainment personalities and executives, such as Andrew Lloyd Webber, as an entertainment lawyer, while quietly authoring a novel that reflects the milieu. In 1997, she transitioned to writing, resigning her position as an attorney.

Author
A story creator since childhood, she co-wrote the novel Homecourt Advantage with Rita Ewing (then spouse of New York Knicks center Patrick Ewing), an intimate portrait of the "dysfunctional off-court lives of multimillionaire athletes and their significant others", according to Washington Post reviewer Kevin Merida, in 1998. It became a bestseller, and film rights to the book were purchased by "a film triad that includes Wesley Snipes' production company."

Her second work, Gotham Diaries, grew out of a collaboration with Tonya Lewis Lee, who is also a lawyer, and the spouse of filmmaker Spike Lee. First envisioned as a television series that would profile upper-class black New Yorkers, the pair shifted to realizing the story, Gotham Diaries, in 2004, as a social satire novel, due to events of 9/11 disrupting plans. The book won Blackboard Fiction Book of the Year in 2005, and returned her to The New York Times Bestseller List. Gotham Diaries is also noted for contributing to an emerging genre of fiction, "black chick-lit".

In 2012, her book, Inspiration: Profiles of Black Women Changing Our World with her producing partner Nathan Hale Williams and photography by Lauri Lyons was published. She has also authored numerous magazine articles.

Entertainment industry
She began a film career in 2006, as an executive producer, with Nathan Hale Williams, for the feature film Dirty Laundry, which offers a perspective on homosexuality in Southern African-American families, winning top honors, including Best Feature Film award, at the American Black Film Festival in 2007. That year, when listed among the top 40 Under 40 by Crain’s New York Business, Williams affectionately referred to McCrary McGuire as "a baby mogul in training". In 2008, the film was nominated for a GLAAD Award.

McCrary has developed projects with BET Networks, co-hosted My Two Cents, and served as executive producer, in 2006, for reality show My Model Is Better Than Your Model, and for the series Real-Life Divas, which profiles African-American women and ran for four seasons. She was executive producer for documentary series Leading Women and Leading Men, which earned an NAACP Image Award nomination in 2009. In 2015, she was commissioned to make a short film to commemorate the 75th anniversary of the NAACP Legal Defense Fund.

She has been featured in People, Essence and Newsweek, and has also appeared as herself in a variety of productions, including Today, Good Morning America, The Big Idea with Donny Deutsch, in 2006, The Sisterhood of the Traveling Pants 2, in 2008, Closet Envy, in 2010, and Girls Who Like Boys Who Like Boys, during 2010 to 2011.  She appeared as a pop-culture commentator on American Morning for CNN in 2004 and 2005. and on Verdict with Dan Abrams for NBC, in 2008, alongside Pat Buchanan and Lawrence O'Donnell, as a guest host for The View, and as a legal analyst for CNBC, Fox News, and Court TV (now truTV).

Her directorial debut was the AAU youth basketball documentary Little Ballers in 2013, which she also co-produced; it was televised by Nickelodeon in 2015, the first documentary to be aired on NickSports. In 2017, Nickelodeon premiered her three-part docuseries, Little Ballers Indiana, which chronicles six diverse, fledgling female basketball players in the hometown of WNBA player Skylar Diggins, South Bend, Indiana.

In 2021, HBO Max premiered a reboot of Sex and the City, titled And Just Like That..., which introduced a recurring new character reportedly inspired by McCrary McGuire, named "Lisa Todd Wexley".

References

1969 births
Living people
People from Detroit
University of Michigan alumni
Washington College of Law alumni
New York University School of Law alumni
American women lawyers
American women novelists
American women writers
American women film producers
American women film directors
American women documentary filmmakers